The Barefoot Rugby League Show is an Australian sports variety television programme, shown on NITV, as well as 31 Brisbane. Hosted by Brad Cooke and indigenous former international rugby league footballers Tony Currie and David Peachey, the programme is filmed at Fox Studios Australia in Sydney.

References

External links
Official site
Barefoot Rugby League on facebook

2008 Australian television series debuts
2000s Australian television series
2010s Australian television series
English-language television shows
Australian sports television series
Rugby league television shows
National Rugby League
National Indigenous Television original programming
Australian community access television shows